The Indian–Moldovan relations are the bilateral relations between two countries, the Republic of India and the Republic of Moldova. India recognized Moldova at 28 December 1991 and in the following year, both established relations.

The Indian embassy to Moldova is accredited from Bucharest, Romania; while Moldova maintains an honorary consulate in New Delhi and a consulate in Mumbai.

Both countries have taken steps to deepen their ties, which is still maintained in a modest level. Both countries have been found supporting each other at many international platforms like the United Nations through reciprocal support mechanism. India-Moldova bilateral trade has been rather modest. During 2012-13 bilateral trade was measured at US$9.63 mn (Exports US$8.94 mn, Imports US$0.69 mn). During 2011–12, bilateral trade reached US$8 million (India's exports were US$7.5 mn and imports were US$0.5 mn). Recently India has loaned to Moldova in over 5 million rupees to develop its economy.

In 2015, President of India Pranab Mukherjee congratulated Moldova on the National Day of Moldova at August 27.

See also
 Foreign relations of India 
 Foreign relations of Moldova

References

External links
Embassy of India, Bucharest, Romania - MOLDOVA 
Consulate of Moldova in India

 
 
Moldova
Bilateral relations of Moldova